Pod vegetables are a type of fruit vegetables where pods are often eaten when they are still green.

Such plants as green beans or Lotus tetragonolobus in the family Fabaceae, or okras in the family Malvaceae are examples of pod vegetables.

References